
The Fenerbahçe Lighthouse, a historical lighthouse still in use, is located on the northern coast of Sea of Marmara at Fenerbahçe neighborhood of Kadıköy district in Istanbul, Turkey.

History
Historical documents mention that the location of the cape caused often maritime damage. In 1562, Sultan Suleiman the Magnificent (reigned 1520–1566) issued a decree, in which he ordered the establishment of a light on the rocks at Kalamış Cape, as the location was called that time.

Built in 1857, the lighthouse stands on a point at Cape Fenerbahçe close to the eastern side of the Bosporus entrance. The location Fenerbahçe was named after the lighthouse (literally: "Fener" for lighthouse and "bahçe" for garden). The  tower with a cylindrical form has two galleries. The lighthouse is painted white. A masonry one-story keeper's house is attached to it.

The lighthouse was initially lit by kerosene, however the light source was later replaced by Dalén light using carbide (acetylene gas). Currently, it runs on electricity. The lighthouse's lantern has a 1,000 W light source. The lighthouse's foghorn blasts every 60 seconds in foggy conditions.

Fenerbahçe lighthouse is listed in Turkey under the code "TUR-021" and its radio call sign is TC2FLH. It is operated and maintained by the Coastal Safety Authority of the Ministry of Transport and Communication.

The lighthouse and the keeper's house are under protection as a national heritage site. The site is open to the public, however the tower is closed.

See also

 List of lighthouses in Turkey

References

External links

 Directorate General of Coastal Safety

Lighthouses completed in 1857
Tourist attractions in Istanbul
Sea of Marmara
Lighthouses in Istanbul
Kadıköy
1857 establishments in the Ottoman Empire